Aituaria is a genus of spiders in the family Nesticidae. It was first described in 1998 by Esyunin & Efimik. , it contains two species, Aituaria nataliae and Aituaria pontica, the latter of which was transferred from Nesticus first to Carpathonesticus, then to Aituaria.

References

Nesticidae
Araneomorphae genera